Evan Pettersson is a retired Swedish footballer. Pettersson made 40 Allsvenskan appearances for Djurgården and scored 0 goals.

References

Swedish footballers
Djurgårdens IF Fotboll players
Association footballers not categorized by position
Year of birth missing